Rashid Farooqui is a Pakistani actor who appears in Pakistani films and television series. He is known for his villainous roles such as Inspector Ibrahim in Laal Kabootar.

Career
Rashid Farooqui started his career as a theatre actor and later became television actor. He has appeared in various television series and telefilms in Pakistan including the telefilm Too Late The Reformer and Shahrukh Khan Ki Maut (2005). Farooqui made his Lollywood debut in Mehreen Jabbar's drama film Ramchand Pakistani (2008) in which he played the lead role and got nominated for Lux Style Award for Best Actor (Male). In 2009, Farooqui appeared in Insha'Allah, followed by Maalik (2016). He has also made appearance in Zindagi Kitni Haseen Hay (2016).

Filmography

Television

Accolades

References

External links

Living people
Pakistani male film actors
Pakistani male television actors
Male actors from Karachi
21st-century Pakistani male actors
Place of birth missing (living people)
1976 births
Male actors in Urdu cinema